Anastasiya Komardina and Nadia Podoroska were the defending champions, but both chose not to participate.

Laura Pigossi and Renata Zarazúa won the title, defeating Anastasia Grymalska and Giorgia Marchetti in the final, 6–1, 4–6, [13–11].

Seeds

Draw

Draw

References
Main Draw

Torneo Internazionale Femminile Antico Tiro a Volo - Doubles